Kleiner Rummelsberg is a hill in Brandenburg, Germany.

Hills of Brandenburg